Dato' Dr. Yeow Chai Thiam (19 April 1953 – 7 January 2016) was a Malaysian politician and medical doctor. He was a Malaysian Federal Senator for one term, gaining an appointment in 2009. He was a member of the Conservative Malaysian Chinese Association (MCA) and the former MCA Chairman  for the state of Negeri Sembilan, the MCA is part of the Federal ruling Barisan Nasional (BN) coalition which has been Malaysia's ruling political party since independence in 1963. Yeow served as the Assemblyman for Jimah and Lukut in the Negeri Sembilan State Legislative Assembly for 20 years and was the State EXCO for Utilities and Local Government for two terms.

Personal life
Yeow was born and lived in Port Dickson, and was married with two children.

Education
Yeow studied medicine in the National University of Malaysia (UKM) and received his Doctors of Human Letters from Summit University of Louisiana.

Founder of Mawar Renal Medical Center
Yeow was the founder and Chairman of Mawar Renal Medical Centre, a non-profit General Hospital with the largest network of kidney dialysis centres in Malaysia comprising a total of 14 branches.

Death
Yeow died at the age of 63 after a long battle with cancer at his home at Port Dickson on 7 January 2016.

Election results

Honours
 :
 Knight Companion of the Order of Loyalty to Negeri Sembilan (D.S.N.S.) - Dato' (1996)

References

External links
 Senator Convinces Suspect to Surrender

1953 births
2016 deaths
People from Negeri Sembilan
Malaysian people of Chinese descent
Malaysian nephrologists
Malaysian Chinese Association politicians
National University of Malaysia alumni
Members of the Dewan Negara
Members of the Negeri Sembilan State Legislative Assembly
Negeri Sembilan state executive councillors